The 2016 season was New Radiant Sports Club's 37th year in existence as a football club.

Background
The Blues appointed their former coach Yordan Stoykov who lead them to the Semi-finals of the 2005 AFC Cup for the new season. He was the coach of Mahibadhoo Sports Club which got relegated in the previous season. On 18 August 2016, he resigned after 4 straight losses in the league, aggregating 0–9 and New Radiant were also eliminated from the AFC Cup group stage without a win.

Despite appointing former coach Nikola Kavazović who lead them to 2015 Dhivehi Premier League glory on 3 September 2016, club was instructed by assistant coach Ashraf Luthfy as Kavazović was on a suspension by Football Association of Maldives since 2015. On 23 September 2016, New Radiant released Kavazović and appointed Ashraf Luthfy as the caretaker manager and Ahmed Niyaz as the new assistant coach until the end of the season.

Kit
Sponsor: Samsung

Competitions

Overall

Competition record

*Draws include knockout matches decided on penalty kicks.

AFC Cup

Group stage

Dhivehi Premier League

Matches

League table

FA Cup

President's Cup

References

External links
 2016 in Maldivian football at RSSSF

New Radiant S.C. seasons